The 2010 Canadian Major Indoor Soccer League (CMISL) season saw the reactivation of the Winnipeg Alliance FC and the expansion of the Prince George Fury. Each team played four games against teams from the Professional Arena Soccer League (PASL) in the United States. The season consisted of twelve soccer games total. The Edmonton Drillers, Saskatoon Accelerators, Prince George Fury and Winnipeg Alliance FC played six home games and the Calgary United FC played seven due to playing American teams.

Teams

Standings

Canadian Major Indoor Soccer League
Indoor
2010